Adrien Paul Alexandre Chrétien was a French general who participated in World War I. He spent the war commanding the 30th Army Corps  at throughout several battles of the Western Front.

Biography

In 1892, he was a captain in the 3rd Algerian Tirailleurs Regiment. When World War I broke out, he was a colonel, but from October 19, 1914, he was given the interim command of an infantry brigade. On December 18, 1914, he was appointed brigadier general, then promoted to division general on December 23, 1915. He commanded the 30th Army Corps on January 19, 1916. On January 26, he alerted the high command to the deplorable state of the defenses in the Battle of Verdun.

Chrétien was wounded twice, first disfigured by a bullet which hit him in the right ear during the Tonkin Campaign, then hit in the knee on September 6, 1914. General Chrétien was made Commander of the Legion of Honor on March 25, 1915.

In February 1916, when the Battle of Verdun broke out, he commanded the 30th Army Corps, whose headquarters was located at Fort Souville.

He after the war, he retired to Harcourt in 1921.

Personal life

Awards
Legion of Honor, Grand Officer (December 10, 1921)
Commander on March 25, 1915
Officer on December 30, 1906
Knight on July 5, 1887
Croix de guerre 1914–1918 (1 Palm)
1914–1918 Inter-Allied Victory medal
Tonkin Expedition commemorative medal
1914–1918 Commemorative war medal

Foreign Awards
: Croix de guerre
: Order of the Crown of Italy, Grand crown and grand cross
: War Merit Cross
: Order of the Bath, Knights Companion
 Tunisia: Nichan Iftikhar (July 28, 1900)

References

Bibliography
 Annuaire officiel de l'armée française, Berger-Levrault, Paris, 1897, p. 103
 « Le général Chrétien », in Le Pays de France, no. 171, January 24, 1918, p. 3 
 Les armées françaises dans la grande guerre, Imprimerie nationale, 1934
 
 G. Douare, Verdun sauvé par le général Chrétien et le 30e corps d'armée, 21-25 février 1916, Berger-Levrault, Paris, 1953, p. 144

1862 births
1948 deaths
French military personnel of World War I
People from Côte-d'Or
French generals
École Spéciale Militaire de Saint-Cyr alumni
Chevaliers of the Légion d'honneur
Officiers of the Légion d'honneur
Commandeurs of the Légion d'honneur
Grand Officiers of the Légion d'honneur
Knights Companion of the Order of the Bath
Recipients of the Order of the Crown (Italy)
Recipients of the War Merit Cross (Italy)
Recipients of the Croix de guerre (Belgium)